Quivira is a place named by Spanish conquistador Francisco Vásquez de Coronado in 1541, for the mythical Seven Cities of Gold that he never found. 

Quivira was a province of the ancestral Wichita people, located near the Great Bend of the Arkansas River in central Kansas, The exact site may be near present-day Lyons extending northeast to Salina. 

The Wichita city of Etzanoa, which flourished between 1450 and 1700, is likely part of Quivira.

Expedition

In 1540, Spaniard Francisco Vásquez de Coronado led a large expedition north from Mexico to search for wealth and the Seven Cities of Cibola. Instead of wealth, he found Indigenous farmers living in an array of communities and villages in what are today Arizona and New Mexico. These were the Hopi, Zuni, Rio Grande Pueblo, Apache, and Navajo peoples.

As Coronado arrived at the Rio Grande, he was disappointed by the lack of wealth among the Pueblo people, but he heard from a Plains Indian informant dubbed “The Turk” of a wealthy nation named Quivira far to the east, whose leader supposedly drank from golden cups hanging from the trees. Hearing of this, Coronado led an expedition of more than 1000 Spanish and Indigenous individuals onto the Great Plains in 1541. The Turk served as the expedition’s adviser.

On his journey, Coronado traversed the Staked Plains, home to two Indigenous nations: the Querecho and Teya. He was heading southeast when the Teyas told him that the Turk was taking him in the wrong direction and that Quivira was to the north. It appears the Turk was luring the Spaniards away from New Mexico with tales of wealth in Quivira, hoping perhaps that they would get lost in the vastness of the Great Plains. Coronado sent most of his slow-moving expeditionary force back to New Mexico. With 30 mounted Spaniards, Indigenous persons, priests, the Turk and Teya captives forced into service, Coronado changed course northward in search of Quivira. After a march of more than 30 days, he found a large river, probably the Arkansas, and soon met several Indigenous bison hunters, who led him to Quivira.

Description
Coronado found Quivira "well settled.... The land itself being very fat and black and being very well watered by the rivulets and springs and rivers. I found prunes like those of Spain, and nuts and very good sweet grapes and mulberries." It was, he said, the best land he had seen during his long trek north from Mexico. Coronado spent 25 days in Quivira and traveled about 25 leagues  from one end of the country to the other. He found nothing more than straw-thatched villages of up to 200 houses each and fields of corn, beans, and squash. He found no gold, other than a single small piece, which he speculated the Indigenous owner acquired from a member of his own expedition.

Both sexes wore minimal attire. 

Coronado was escorted to the border of Quivira at an area called Tabas where the neighboring nation of Harahey began. He summoned the "Lord of Harahey" who, with a retinue of nearly 200, came to meet the Spanish. The Harahey delegation were "all naked — with bows and some sort of things on their heads, and their privy parts slightly covered. It was the same sort of place ... and of about the same size as Quivira." Disappointed at his failure to find wealth, Coronado turned his face toward New Mexico and marched back across the plains, met up with the rest of his army there, and the following year returned to Mexico. Before leaving Quivira, Coronado ordered the Turk executed by strangulation. The Coronado expedition had failed in its quest for gold.

Coronado left behind in New Mexico several Catholic priests and their helpers, including Friar Juan de Padilla. Padilla journeyed back to Quivira with a Portuguese assistant and several Indigenous converts. The friar and most of his companions were soon killed by people from Quivira, apparently because he wished to leave their country to visit their enemies, the Guas. Portuguese and Native survivors reported the story.

Later expeditions 

In 1594, Francisco Leyba (Leyva) Bonilla and Antonio de Humana (Umana) made another attempt to find the Quivira of Coronado, though it was denounced as unauthorized by Spanish officials. Only Jusepe Gutierrez, a Nahua returned from this journey. He related that Leyba had killed Umana in a quarrel and that he (Jusepe) had deserted the expedition.
 
Following this, in 1601, the governor of New Mexico, Juan de Oñate, undertook another expedition in search of Quivira. He found settlements of the Escanjaque and Rayado in the Central Great Plains, but no gold or silver. He learned that Leyba and other members of the Umana and Lebya expedition had been killed by Indians. In 1606, 800 people from Quivira reportedly visited Oñate in New Mexico to trade.

In his 1634 expedition, Captain Alonzo Vaca found Quivira 300 leagues east of New Mexico (this suggests more than ). Another reputed expedition was undertaken in 1662 by Diego Dionisio de Penalosa, who allegedly found a large settlement he called a city, but a modern re-examination of his account concluded that the story is fanciful. 

Spanish accounts said Quivirans were enemies of the Escanjaques. In 1675 and 1678 came "two Spanish royal orders for the conquest of Quivira."

Location and ethnic identity 

Archaeological evidence suggests that Quivira was located near the Great Bend of the Arkansas River in central Kansas. The remains of several Indigenous communities have been found near Lyons along Cow Creek and the Little Arkansas River along with articles of Spanish manufacture dating from Coronado's time.

The Quivirans were almost certainly the Wichita. Coronado's meager descriptions of Quivira resemble more recent post-contact Wichita communities. The Quivirans seem to have been numerous, based on the number of settlements Coronado visited, with a population of at least 10,000 persons. They were good farmers as well as hunters. Judging from Coronado's description, they were a healthy, peaceful people.

The nation of Harahey Coronado found on the borders of Quivira may have been located on the Smoky Hill River near the present city of Salina, Kansas.

The next confirmed European visitor to the Great Bend region after Coronado was Étienne de Bourgmont. In 1724, along with a company of Kaw and other Indigenous explorers, de Bourgmont traveled westward from the Missouri River to a large Indigenous community believed to have an Plains Apache population. The village was near Lyons, precisely where Quivira had been almost 200 years earlier.

The original inhabitants of Quivira migrated to eastern Kansas and south to Oklahoma. Their reasons for moving may have been to escape the encroachment of the Plains Apache, whose expansion created war and hostilities among the nations of the Great Plains. It also appears that the 18th-century Wichita of the 18th century were fewer in number than in the 16th century. This decrease is likely due to smallpox and other European diseases.

Etymology 
The origin of the word "Quivira" is uncertain. The inhabitants of Coronado's Quivira called themselves "Tancoa" and "Tabas. These two names are similar to the Wichita tribes, the Tawakonis and Taovayas.

In cartography

On early 16th- and 17th-century maps of North America, a large region including what is now Kansas, Oklahoma, southeastern Colorado, northeastern New Mexico and the Texas Panhandle was called "Quivira".

Legacy
The last remnants of the formerly extensive cartographic region of Quivira today is the city of Lake Quivira and the Quivira National Wildlife Refuge in Kansas. In addition, the "Quivira Council" of the Boy Scouts serves the area of southwestern Kansas around Wichita; the central part of the area that was traditionally called Quivira. The first several yearbooks printed by the University of Kansas were entitled Quivira Also, a major arterial road runs through the Johnson County suburbs of Kansas City named "Quivira Road".

A large abandoned pueblo in Torrance County, New Mexico, was named "La Gran Quivira" ("the Great Quivira"). The community was located within Tompiro-speaking Pueblo territory. During the early period of the Spanish conquest, when the town was called Pueblo de Las Humanas, a mission was built here. In the 1670s, the Tompiro communities were abandoned and absorbed into other Pueblos. The remains of Gran Quivira Pueblo and the mission are today part of Salinas Pueblo Missions National Monument.

See also
City of the Caesars
El Dorado
Fountain of Youth
La Canela
Paititi
Sierra de la Plata

References

External links 
 The journey of Coronado, 1540-1542, from the city of Mexico to the Grand Canon of the Colorado and the buffalo plains of Texas, Kansas and Nebraska, as told by himself and his followers - Complete primary documents pertaining to Coronado's expeditions, translated by George Parker Winship, at Portal to Texas History.

Mythological populated places
Native American history of Kansas
Native American history of Nebraska
Colonial United States (Spanish)
Spanish colonization of the Americas
Plains tribes
Wichita tribe
Colonial New Mexico

simple:Quivira and Cíbola